Taling Chan is one of the 50 districts (khet) of Bangkok, Thailand. Its neighbours, clockwise from the north, are Bang Kruai district of Nonthaburi province and Bang Phlat, Bangkok Noi, Bangkok Yai, Phasi Charoen, Bang Khae, and Thawi Watthana Districts of Bangkok.

History
Taling Chan is an old district back when there was Thonburi province. Now Thonburi is merged into Bangkok. In 1998, part of the district was split into a new Thawi Watthana district. Historically, much of the area was used as orchards and kitchen gardens, many remaining there today. It has been called "Bangkok's Kitchen".

The landscape of Taling Chan about 1,000 years ago is believed to have been part of the Chao Phraya River delta. The area was a muddy mangrove forest and there was no evidence of human settlement.

Two areas of Taling Chan, Bang Ramat and Bang Chueak Nang, were mentioned to in the Kamsuan Samut of the Ayutthaya period. They are regarded as among Bangkok's oldest zones.

During World War II, a southern railway line running through the district was one a target of Allied bombing.

Taling Chan has a rectangular area and is full of many waterways that cross each other. It is also an agricultural area, therefore making it difficult to access by road. Today there are many roads passing through the area such as Borommaratchachonnani, Ratchaphruek, Phutthamonthon Sai 1, and Phutthamonthon Sai 4, but the most convenient route is still by water. Taling Chan has both BMTA and affiliated buses service just a few lines. There was no electricity in the area until 1972.

Administration

The district is divided into six sub-districts (khwaeng).

Places

Taling Chan Floating Market is on the canal Khlong Chak Phra (คลองชักพระ) Canal in front of the district office. It is open only on weekends from about 08:30 to 16:00. Orchard produce such as fruits, and vegetables, as well as fish are sold from boats. There is a live traditional Thai music performance from 11:00 to 14:00. The idea for the floating market here was initiated by Chamlong Srimuang in 1987 to honour King Bhumibol's 60th birthday. This is a new attraction since floating markets, an old way of life of the Thai people, had vanished entirely from Bangkok for quite a long time.

In addition, There are also 4–5 other floating markets in the district, including Wat Champa Floating Market, which is on the way to Khlong Bang Ramat (คลองบางระมาด). Here, locals have a traditional way of life and preserve like the past. Now, there is a homestay in cultural tourism form for tourists.

Flower Market Thailand is a new center flower trade of Thailand apart from Pak Khlong Talat in Phra Nakhon.

Accident 
In 1979, 54 people were killed in the worst accident in Thai railway history when a commuter train collided with a freight train at Taling Chan.

References

External links 
 BMA website with the tourist landmarks of Taling Chan
 Taling Chan district office
 
 Planning Department maps of Taling Chan

 
Districts of Bangkok